Six elections were held in the Ottoman Empire for the Chamber of Deputies, the popularly elected lower house of the General Assembly, the Ottoman parliament:

Ottoman general election, 1877 (first)
Ottoman general election, 1877 (second)
1908 Ottoman general election
1912 Ottoman general election
1914 Ottoman general election
1919 Ottoman general election

An election in 1920 was held after the dissolution of the Chamber of Deputies after the Allied occupation of Istanbul, in order to select delegates for the Grand National Assembly of the Turkish National Movement against the Allied occupation of the country:

1920 Ottoman general election